Jacobus Francois "Flooi" du Toit (2 April 1869 – 10 July 1909) was a South African cricket player of the 1890s.

Flooi du Toit has the distinction of making a combined first-class and Test debut. He was Orange Free State's most successful bowler in their match against W. W. Read's English team in March 1892, taking five wickets and making useful runs. Along with Godfrey Cripps, Charles Fichardt and Ernest Halliwell, also combined debutants, du Toit was selected for the only Test match against the English team which began a few days later. In a match England won by an innings and 189 runs, du Toit scored 0 not out and 2 not out, took one wicket (the England captain's) for 47 runs, and held one catch.

Du Toit was born in Jacobsdal in Orange Free State on 2 April 1869 and died in Lindley, in Orange River Colony, on 10 July 1909, aged 40. His death went unrecorded in cricket circles and no obituary appeared for him in Wisden at the time.

References

External links
 
 

1869 births
1909 deaths
People from Letsemeng Local Municipality
Afrikaner people
South Africa Test cricketers
South African cricketers